Country Living is an American lifestyle and home magazine published by the Hearst Corporation since 1978. The monthly magazine focuses on food, home renovation, home decor, DIY and lifestyle. The magazine hosts four Country Living Fairs a year in Rhinebeck, NY, Nashville, TN, Columbus, OH and Atlanta, GA.

In 2014, the magazine relocated its editorial offices from New York City's Hearst Tower (Manhattan) to Birmingham, Alabama. The current editor-in-chief is Rachel Hardage Barrett.

The magazine initially was conceptualized by John Mack Carter.  From 1978 to 1998, the editor-in-chief was Rachel Newman (editor).  The magazine was the first dedicated to the country look, and the focus was originally on Early American and period homes.  In addition to country homes, regular features included home plans, inns, real estate listings, kitchens, cooking and folk remedies.  During its early years, it was the fastest growing publication in the Hearst Corporation's history.

UK edition

The UK edition of the magazine was launched in the summer of 1985. From 1995 the editor-in-chief was Susy Smith, who subsequently left the publication.

References

External links
Official site

Lifestyle magazines published in the United States
Monthly magazines published in the United States
Hearst Communications publications
Magazines established in 1978
Magazines published in Alabama
Magazines published in New York City
Mass media in Birmingham, Alabama